Karl Feucht (24 December 1893 - 30 June 1954) was a German flight mechanic and polar explorer. In 1925 he was one of two mechanics aboard the two Dornier Wal flying boats in which Roald Amundsen, Lincoln Ellsworth and Hjalmar Riiser-Larsen made a failed attempt to reached the geographic North Pole by air, starting from the island of Spitzbergen.

Life 
Born in Heimerdingen, now part of Ditzingen, his parents were the builder Christian Feucht (1856–1929) and his wife Wilhelmine (1863–1954). 
He died in Friedrichshafen. His wife Maria died in 1945. The couple had three children, Richard, Wilhelm and Gertrud.

Bibliography 
  Herbert Hoffmann: Karl Feucht – Pionier der Luftfahrt und Polarflieger aus Heimerdingen. In: Dijou. Nr. 9, 6/2012, S. 10 (PDF; 5,31 MB).

External links

References

Aircraft mechanics
Explorers of the Arctic
People from Ludwigsburg (district)
1893 births
1954 deaths